Israel Mobolaji Odunayo Oluwafemi Temitayo Owolabi Adesanya (born 22 July 1989) is a New Zealand professional mixed martial artist, kickboxer, and former boxer with multiple championships in all three disciplines. As a mixed martial artist, he currently competes in the Middleweight division in the Ultimate Fighting Championship (UFC), where he is a former UFC Middleweight Champion. In kickboxing, he is a former Glory Middleweight Championship title challenger. As of November 14, 2022, he is #1 in the UFC middleweight rankings, and as of March 7, 2023, he is #6 in the UFC men's pound-for-pound rankings.

Adesanya is widely regarded as one of the best strikers in mixed martial arts, both offensively and defensively.

Early life and background 
Adesanya was born in Lagos, Nigeria, the eldest of five children. His father, Oluwafemi, is an accountant and his mother, Taiwo, is a nurse. Adesanya attended Chrisland School, Opebi, and enrolled in its Taekwondo after-school club until he was removed by his mother due to an injury. In 1999, he relocated to Ghana with his family for 10 months, but due to his parents wanting their children to receive a well-recognised higher education, he settled in Rotorua, New Zealand, at age 10 and attended Rotorua Boys' High School. Adesanya was not interested in sports during high school; instead he was interested in Japanese anime such as Death Note and the manga series Naruto. Adesanya was bullied during his high school years and attributes the mistreatment he experienced to his decision to pursue martial arts later in life.

Following high school graduation, Adesanya enrolled in a Bachelor of Science in Computer Design at the Universal College of Learning in Whanganui. At the age of 18, he started training in kickboxing, after being inspired by the Muay Thai film Ong-Bak. Two years later Adesanya made the decision to cease his studies in pursuit of a career in kickboxing and went on to amass an amateur record of 32–0 before turning professional and fighting in China. At the age of 21, Adesanya moved to Auckland, New Zealand, and began training in mixed martial arts under Eugene Bareman at City Kickboxing, with future UFC fighters such as Dan Hooker, Kai Kara-France and current UFC Featherweight Champion Alexander Volkanovski. He trains in wrestling under the Romanian New Zealander Andrei Păuleț.

Adesanya is multilingual. He is fluent in Yoruba, Nigerian Pidgin and English.

Professional kickboxing career

Early beginnings 
In May 2010, Adesanya won the first fight of his seven-fight winning streak, defeating Tim Atonio by unanimous decision. He won his next six fights, fighting almost exclusively with Wu Lin Feng in China. His winning streak earned him a place in the 2014 Kunlun Fight 80 kg tournament, held during Kunlun Fight 2. He lost the semifinal bout against Simon Marcus by an extra round split decision. Adesanya afterwards made his Glory debut at Glory 15, when he faced Filip Verlinden. Verlinden won the fight by unanimous decision. The two of them fought a rematch at Glory of Heroes 3, two years after their first fight, with Adesanya winning a unanimous decision.
 
Adesanya participated in the King in the Ring Cruiserweights II tournament of the regional circuit in New Zealand. In the quarterfinal, he beat Slava Alexeichik by unanimous decision, in the semifinal he beat Pati Afoa by knockout and won the tournament with a knockout of Jamie Eades. Six months later, he took part in the 2015 Cruiserweights III tournament. He scored technical knockouts of Kim Loudon and Mark Timms in the quarterfinal and semifinal bouts respectively, before winning the tournament for the second time with a first-round knockout of Pati Afoa.

Moving up in weight, Adesanya participated in the 2015 The Heavyweights III, as well. He defeated Nase Foai by TKO in the quarterfinal and Dan Roberts by KO in the semifinal, before facing Jamie Eades in the finals. The two had previously met in the final of the 2014 Cruiserweight tournament. Adesanya won the tournament final by unanimous decision.

Glory Middleweight Championship 
Adesanya won five of his next six fights, including victories over Yousri Belgaroui and Bogdan Stoica. His loss came at the hands of future GLORY Middleweight champion Alex Pereira, who won by unanimous decision.

Adesanya participated in the 2016 Glory Middleweight Contender Tournament. He defeated Robert Thomas by unanimous decision in the semifinals, and won the tournament with a split decision victory over Yousri Belgaroui. He fought Jason Wilnis for the Glory Middleweight championship at Glory 37: Los Angeles. Wilnis won the fight by unanimous decision, although the result was considered controversial.

His last kickboxing fight, before transitioning to mixed martial arts, was a rematch with Alex Pereira at Glory of Heroes 7. Pereira won the fight by knockout, after dropping Adesanya with a short left hook in the third round.

Professional mixed martial arts career

Early career 
Adesanya made his professional debut in 2012, with a TKO win against James Griffiths. He scored another TKO win against John Vake, before taking a two-year hiatus from mixed martial arts. He returned to MMA in August 2015, when he won the fight against Song Kenan by TKO. He went on to amass an 8–0 record, fighting mostly in Oceanian and Chinese circuits. During this run, he won the AFC Middleweight Championship at Australia Fighting Championship 20 with a first-round TKO over Melvin Guillard, as well as the Hex Fight Series Middleweight championship with a first-round KO of Stuart Dare.

Ultimate Fighting Championship 
In December 2017, it was announced that Adesanya had signed a contract with the UFC. He made his debut against Rob Wilkinson on 11 February 2018, at UFC 221. He won the fight via technical knockout in the second round. This win earned him the [[List of UFC bonus award recipients|Performance of the Night]] bonus.

Adesanya's next fight took place on 14 April 2018, against Marvin Vettori at UFC on Fox 29. He won the match by split decision.

Adesanya then faced Brad Tavares on 6 July 2018, at The Ultimate Fighter 27 Finale. Adesanya won the one-sided fight via unanimous decision. This win earned him his second Performance of the Night award.

Adesanya faced Derek Brunson on 3 November 2018, at UFC 230. He won the fight via technical knockout in round one. This win earned him the Performance of the Night award for a third time.

While initially expected to serve as the co-main event, Adesanya faced former UFC Middleweight Champion Anderson Silva on 10 February 2019, in the main event of UFC 234. He won the fight via unanimous decision. This fight earned both competitors the Fight of the Night award.

 UFC Middleweight Championship 
Adesanya faced Kelvin Gastelum for the interim UFC Middleweight Championship on 13 April 2019, in the co-main event of UFC 236. He won the back-and-forth fight via unanimous decision, with all three judges scoring the fight 48-46. This fight earned him the Fight of the Night award. The fight was widely regarded as the best fight of the year, earning the nomination from most of the MMA news outlets.

Adesanya then faced Robert Whittaker in a title unification bout on 6 October 2019, headlining UFC 243 for UFC Middleweight Championship. After a knockdown in last second of the first round, Adesanya won the fight via knockout in the second round. This win earned him his fourth Performance of the Night award.

Adesanya next faced three-time UFC title challenger Yoel Romero on 7 March 2020 UFC 248. He won the fight via unanimous decision, with scores of 48–47, 48–47 and 49–46 and defended his title for the first time. Many fans and pundits felt disappointed due to the low activity by both fighters which resulted in a largely uneventful fight in which neither fighter was able to deliver any significant offense.

In his next title defense, Adesanya faced fellow undefeated fighter Paulo Costa on 27 September 2020 at UFC 253. This marked the first time two male unbeaten mixed martial artists met in a title fight since 2009. He won the fight via technical knockout in the second round. This win earned him his fifth Performance of the Night award. After the bout, Adesanya's visible right-breast gynecomastia drummed up controversy due to possible PEDs use, though Adesanya claimed it was due to his usage of marijuana. Adesanya also caused additional controversy by simulating anal sex on the prone Costa at the end of the fight.

Adesanya moved up a weight class and faced Jan Błachowicz for the UFC Light Heavyweight Championship on 6 March 2021, headlining UFC 259. At the weight-ins, Adesanya weighed 200 pounds, five pounds away from the light heavyweight limit. He lost the fight via unanimous decision, with scores of 49–46, 49–45 and 49–45, marking the first time he has been defeated in mixed martial arts.

Adesanya rematched Marvin Vettori for the UFC Middleweight Championship on 12 June 2021, headlining UFC 263. Adesanya controlled a majority of the fight winning via unanimous decision, with all three judges scoring the fight 50–45.

A rematch between Adesanya and Robert Whittaker for the UFC Middleweight Championship took place on 12 February 2022 at UFC 271.  Adesanya won the rematch via unanimous decision, with scores of 48–47, 48–47 and 49–46.

Adesanya faced Jared Cannonier on 2 July 2022, at UFC 276. He won the bout via unanimous decision. This win earn him the Crypto.com Fan Bonus of the Night first place award which paid in bitcoin of US$30,000.

Adesanya faced Alex Pereira, who had two victories against him in kickboxing, on 12 November 2022 at UFC 281. Adesanya lost the fight and title via technical knockout in the fifth round, his first loss at middleweight.

A rematch is scheduled between Andesanya and Pereira for the UFC Middleweight Championship on Apr 8, 2023, at UFC 287.

 Professional boxing career 
 Prizefighting tournaments 
Adesanya began his professional boxing career in November 2014 against two-time Australian champion Daniel Ammann. He was granted one of two wildcards to enter the inaugural cruiserweight Super 8 Boxing Tournament. The event was headlined by Shane Cameron and Kali Meehan at the North Shore Events Centre in Auckland, New Zealand. He suffered a controversial loss via unanimous decision after he looked to have outpointed Ammann in the quarter-finals.

Adesanya re-entered the Super 8 tournament in May 2015, held at Horncastle Arena in Christchurch. It was the second cruiserweight series with the winner receiving $25,000 NZD and a new car. He won his first professional fight against fellow New Zealander Asher Derbyshire in the first seed. Adesanya knocked his opponent out in the second round. In the second fight of the tournament, Adesanya won a majority decision against Lance Bryant. In the tournament final, he defeated Brian Minto by split decision.

Adesanya fought in the 2015 Super 8 Cruiserweight tournament. He won his semifinal match against Zane Hopman by unanimous decision, and defended the cruiserweight crown with a unanimous decision win against Lance Bryant in the final.

 Controversies 
In February 2020, Adesanya came under fire for comments made at the UFC 248 pre-fight press conference, where he said he would make opponent Yoel Romero "crumble like the Twin Towers", referencing the September 11 attacks. The following day, Adesanya made an apology on his Instagram page, saying "I was simply rambling and my brain worked faster than my mouth in a moment to choose the wrong euphemism. You speak on the mic enough times and you're bound to miss the mark with some bars. I did on this one and for that I'm sorry. I'll be more careful in future with my words."

On 25 March 2021, New Zealand Deputy Prime Minister and Minister of Sport, Grant Robertson, spoke out against Adesanya's "flippant comments" on his Instagram "Bro, I will fuckin' rape you" aimed at fellow UFC middleweight fighter, Kevin Holland. Robertson commented "I'm sure Israel understands that, I believe he has deleted the tweet in question. It will be up to the UFC as to what they do. But I would certainly be making clear to him [Adesanya], and to anybody actually, that we have to take rape seriously. It's not an issue that anyone should be making jokes or flippant comments about at all."

On 16 November 2022, Adesanya was arrested at John F. Kennedy International Airport in New York City for the possession of brass knuckles.

 Personal life 
Before taking up fighting, Adesanya regularly competed in dance competitions across New Zealand. He highlighted his passion for dance in a choreographed walkout at UFC 243.

Adesanya is a fan of anime and has stated he would like to start an anime production company after retiring from fighting. His nickname "The Last Stylebender" is a reference to Avatar: The Last Airbender, an anime-influenced cartoon series. Adesanya has the image of one of the show's main characters, Toph Beifong, tattooed on his forearm.

In September 2020, he became the first mixed martial arts athlete to sign a sponsorship deal with Puma. Adesanya was also signed as an ambassador for Stake.com in January 2021.

Views and positions
Adesanya endorsed a "yes" vote in the 2020 New Zealand cannabis referendum.

In June 2021, Adesanya advocated tougher penalties against coward punching following the death of his training partner Fau Vake, who died after being punched in the head the previous month.

 Championships and accomplishments 
 Boxing 
Super 8 Boxing Tournament
 Super 8 III Cruiserweight Champion (eight man Tournament)
 Super 8 IV Cruiserweight Champion (four man Tournament)

 Kickboxing 
King in the Ring
 King in the Ring 86 kg II Champion (Eight Man Tournament)
 King in the Ring 86 kg III Champion (Eight Man Tournament)
 King in the Ring 100kgs II Champion (Eight Man Tournament)
Glory
 2016 Glory Middleweight Contender Tournament Winner (Four Man Tournament)

Awards
Combat Press
 2017 Fight of the Year (vs. Alex Pereira)

 Mixed martial arts 
Ultimate Fighting Championship
UFC Middleweight Championship (One time) 
 Five successful title defenses
Interim UFC Middleweight Championship (One time)
Performance of the Night (Five times) 
Fight of the Night (Two times) 
Most Knockdowns in a UFC Title Fight (4)
Second longest winning streak in the UFC Middleweight division history (12)
Second most title fight wins in the UFC Middleweight division history (7)
Longest average fight time in the UFC Middleweight division history (17.55)
Australian Fighting Championship
AFC Middleweight Champion (one time)
Hex Fighting Series Middleweight
Hex Fighting Series Middleweight Champion (one time)
MMAJunkie.com
2018 Newcomer of the Year
2019 April Fight of the Month vs. Kelvin Gastelum
2019 Fight of the Year vs. Kelvin Gastelum
2019 Male Fighter of the Year
MMA Fighting
2018 Breakthrough Fighter of the Year
2019 Fight of the Year vs. Kelvin Gastelum
2019 Fighter of the Year
CombatPress.com
2018 Breakout Fighter of the Year
2019 Male Fighter of the Year
2019 Fight of the Year vs. Kelvin Gastelum
CagesidePress.com
2019 Fighter of the Year 
2019 Fight of the Year vs. Kelvin Gastelum
MMADNA.nl
2018 Rising Star of the Year.
The Body Lock
2019 Fighter of the Year
World MMA Awards
2018 Breakthrough Fighter of the Year
2019 – July 2020 Charles 'Mask' Lewis Fighter of the Year
2019 – July 2020 International Fighter of the Year
2021 International Fighter of the Year
Voting period for 2019 awards ran from January 2019 to July 2020 due to the COVID-19 pandemic. Subsequently, the voting period for 2021 awards ran from July 2020 to July 2021.
MMAMania.com
2019 Fighter of the Year
2019 Fight of the Year 
Halberg Awards
2019 New Zealand Sportsman of the Year
Wrestling Observer Newsletter
Most Outstanding Fighter of the Year (2019, 2020)
MMA Match of the Year (vs. Kelvin Gastelum, 2019)

 Pay-per-view bouts 

 Mixed martial arts record 

|-
|Loss
|align=center|23–2
|Alex Pereira
|TKO (punches)
|UFC 281
| 
|align=center|5
|align=center|2:01
|New York City, New York, United States
|
|-
|Win
|align=center|23–1
|Jared Cannonier
|Decision (unanimous)
|UFC 276
| 
|align=center|5
|align=center|5:00
|Las Vegas, Nevada, United States
|
|-
|Win
|align=center|22–1
|Robert Whittaker
|Decision (unanimous)
|UFC 271
|
|align=center|5
|align=center|5:00
|Houston, Texas, United States
|
|-
|Win
|align=center|21–1
|Marvin Vettori
|Decision (unanimous)
|UFC 263
|
|align=center|5
|align=center|5:00
|Glendale, Arizona, United States
|
|-
|Loss
|align=center|20–1
|Jan Błachowicz
|Decision (unanimous)
|UFC 259
|
|align=center|5
|align=center|5:00
|Las Vegas, Nevada, United States
|
|-
|Win
|align=center|20–0
|Paulo Costa
|TKO (punches and elbows)
|UFC 253 
|
|align=center|2
|align=center|3:59
|Abu Dhabi, United Arab Emirates
| 
|- 
|Win
|align=center|19–0
|Yoel Romero
|Decision (unanimous)
|UFC 248
|
|align=center|5
|align=center|5:00
|Las Vegas, Nevada, United States
|
|-
|Win
|align=center|18–0
|Robert Whittaker
|KO (punches)
|UFC 243
|
|align=center|2
|align=center|3:33
|Melbourne, Australia
|
|-
|Win
|align=center|17–0
|Kelvin Gastelum
|Decision (unanimous)
|UFC 236
|
|align=center|5
|align=center|5:00
|Atlanta, Georgia, United States 
| 
|-
|Win
|align=center|16–0
|Anderson Silva
|Decision (unanimous)
|UFC 234
|
|align=center|3
|align=center|5:00
|Melbourne, Australia
|
|-
|Win
|align=center|15–0
|Derek Brunson
|TKO (knees and punches)
|UFC 230
|
|align=center|1
|align=center|4:51
|New York City, New York, United States
|
|-
|Win
|align=center|14–0
|Brad Tavares
|Decision (unanimous)
|The Ultimate Fighter: Undefeated Finale
|
|align=center|5
|align=center|5:00
|Las Vegas, Nevada, United States
|
|-
|Win
|align=center|13–0
|Marvin Vettori
|Decision (split)
|UFC on Fox: Poirier vs. Gaethje
|
|align=center|3
|align=center|5:00
|Glendale, Arizona, United States
|
|-
|Win
|align=center|12–0
|Rob Wilkinson
|TKO (knees and punches)
|UFC 221 
|
|align=center|2
|align=center|3:37
|Perth, Australia
|
|-
| Win
| align=center| 11–0
| Stuart Dare
| KO (head kick)
| Hex Fighting Series 12
| 
| align=center| 1
| align=center| 4:53
| Melbourne, Australia
| 
|-
| Win
| align=center| 10–0
| Melvin Guillard
| TKO (punches)
| AFC 20
| 
| align=center| 1
| align=center| 4:49
| Melbourne, Australia
| 
|-
| Win
| align=center| 9–0
| Murad Kuramagomedov
| TKO (punches)
| Wu Lin Feng: E.P.I.C. 4
| 
| align=center| 2
| align=center| 1:05
| Henan, China
|
|-
| Win
| align=center| 8–0
| Andrew Flores Smith
| TKO (corner stoppage)
| Glory of Heroes 2
| 
| align=center| 1
| align=center| 5:00
| Shenzhen, China
|
|-
| Win
| align=center| 7–0
| Dibir Zagirov
| TKO (punches)
| Wu Lin Feng: E.P.I.C. 2
| 
| align=center| 2
| align=center| 2:23
| Henan, China
|
|-
| Win
| align=center| 6–0
| Vladimir Katykhin
| TKO (doctor stoppage)
| Wu Lin Feng: E.P.I.C. 1
| 
| align=center| 2
| align=center| 2:13
| Henan, China
|
|-
| Win
| align=center| 5–0
| Gele Qing
| TKO (elbows)
| Wu Lin Feng 2015: New Zealand vs. China
| 
| align=center| 2
| align=center| 3:37
| Auckland, New Zealand
|
|-
| Win
| align=center| 4–0
| Maui Tuigamala
| TKO (kick to the body)
| Fair Pay Fighting 1
| 
| align=center| 2
| align=center| 1:25
| Auckland, New Zealand
|
|-
| Win
| align=center| 3–0
| Song Kenan
| TKO (head kick)
| The Legend of Emei 3
| 
| align=center| 1
| align=center| 1:59
| Shahe, China
| 
|-
| Win
| align=center| 2–0
| John Vake
| TKO (punches)
| Shuriken MMA: Best of the Best
| 
| align=center| 1
| align=center| 4:43
| Auckland, New Zealand
|
|-
| Win
| align=center| 1–0
| James Griffiths
| TKO (punches)
| Supremacy Fighting Championship 9
| 
| align=center| 1
| align=center| 2:09
| Auckland, New Zealand
| 
|-

 Professional kickboxing record (incomplete) 

|-
|-  style="background:#FFBBBB"
| 2017-03-04 || Loss ||align=left| Alex Pereira || Glory of Heroes 7 || Sao Paulo, Brazil || KO (left hook) || 3 ||0:42 || 30–5
|-
|-  style="background:#FFBBBB
| 2017-01-20 || Loss ||align=left| Jason Wilnis|| Glory 37: Los Angeles || Los Angeles, California, US || Decision (unanimous) || 5 || 3:00 || 30–4
|-
! style=background:white colspan=9 |
|-
|-  bgcolor="#CCFFCC"
| 2016-10-21 || Win ||align=left| Yousri Belgaroui || Glory 34: Denver – Middleweight Contender Tournament Finals || Broomfield, Colorado, US || Decision (split) || 3 || 3:00|| 30–3
|-
! style=background:white colspan=9 |
|-
|-  bgcolor="#CCFFCC"
| 2016-10-21 || Win ||align=left| Robert Thomas || Glory 34: Denver – Middleweight Contender Tournament, Semi Finals || Broomfield, Colorado, US || Decision (unanimous) || 3 || 3:00|| 29–3
|-
|-  bgcolor="#CCFFCC"
| 2016-10-01 || Win ||align=left| Bogdan Stoica || Glory of Heroes 5 || Zhengzhou, China ||KO (left mid kick) || 2|| 1:45|| 28–3
|-
|-  bgcolor="#CCFFCC"
| 2016-09-17 || Win ||align=left| Romain Falendry || Rise of Heroes 1 || Chaoyang, Liaoning, China || Decision (unanimous) || 3 || 3:00 || 27–3
|-
|-  bgcolor="#CCFFCC"
| 2016-08-06 || Win ||align=left| Yousri Belgaroui|| Glory of Heroes 4 || Changzhi, China || Decision (unanimous) || 3 || 3:00|| 26–3
|-
|-  bgcolor="#CCFFCC"
| 2016-07-02 || Win ||align=left| Filip Verlinden || Glory of Heroes 3 || Jiyuan, Henan, China || Decision (unanimous) || 3 || 3:00|| 13–2
|-
|-  bgcolor="#CCFFCC"
| 2016-06-25 || Win ||align=left| Vitaly Kodin || Wu Lin Feng || China || Decision (unanimous) || 3 || 3:00|| 25–3
|-
|-  bgcolor="#FFBBBB"
| 2016-04-02 || Loss ||align=left| Alex Pereira || Glory of Heroes 1 || Shenzhen, China || Decision (unanimous) || 3 || 3:00|| 24–3
|-
|-  bgcolor="#CCFFCC"
| 2016-01-30 || Win ||align=left| Carl N'Diaye || The Legend of Emei 7 – Wenjiang || Wenjiang, China || KO (left hook to the body) || 1 || 3:00|| 24–2
|-
|-  bgcolor="#CCFFCC"
| 2015-10-31 || Win ||align=left| Jamie Eades ||  King in the Ring 100 – The Heavyweights III, Final || Auckland, New Zealand || Decision (unanimous) || 3 || 3:00|| 23–2
|-
! style=background:white colspan=9 |
|-
|-  bgcolor="#CCFFCC"
| 2015-10-31 || Win ||align=left| Dan Roberts ||  King in the Ring 100 – The Heavyweights III, Semi Finals || Auckland, New Zealand || KO || 1 || 0:26|| 22–2
|-
|-  bgcolor="#CCFFCC"
| 2015-10-31 || Win ||align=left| Nase Foai ||  King in the Ring 100 – The Heavyweights III, Quarter Finals || Auckland, New Zealand || TKO || 3 || N/A || 21–2
|-
|-  bgcolor="#CCFFCC"
| 2015-04-11 || Win ||align=left| Pati Afoa ||  King in the Ring 86 – The Cruiserweights III, Final || Auckland, New Zealand || KO || 1 || N/A || 20–2
|-
! style=background:white colspan=9 |
|-
|-  bgcolor="#CCFFCC"
| 2015-04-11 || Win ||align=left| Mark Timms ||  King in the Ring 86 – The Cruiserweights III, Semi Finals || Auckland, New Zealand || TKO || 2 || N/A|| 19–2
|-
|-  bgcolor="#CCFFCC"
| 2015-04-11 || Win ||align=left| Kim Loudon ||  King in the Ring 86 – The Cruiserweights III, Quarter Finals || Auckland, New Zealand || TKO || 3 || N/A || 18–2
|-
|-  bgcolor="#CCFFCC"
| 2015-02-14 || Win ||align=left| Kim Loudon || Knees of Fury 50 || Adelaide, Australia || TKO || 4 || N/A || 17–2
|-
|-  bgcolor="#CCFFCC"
| 2014-08-30 || Win ||align=left| Jamie Eades ||  King in the Ring 86 – The Cruiserweights II, Final || Auckland, New Zealand || KO || 1 || N/A || 16–2
|-
! style=background:white colspan=9 |
|-
|-  bgcolor="#CCFFCC"
| 2014-08-30 || Win ||align=left| Pati Afoa ||  King in the Ring 86 – The Cruiserweights II, Semi Finals || Auckland, New Zealand || KO || N/A || N/A || 15–2
|-
|-  bgcolor="#CCFFCC"
| 2014-08-30 || Win ||align=left| Slava Alexeichik ||  King in the Ring 86 – The Cruiserweights II, Quarter Finals || Auckland, New Zealand || Decision (unanimous) || 3 || 3:00|| 14–2
|-
|-  bgcolor="#FFBBBB"
| 2014-04-12 || Loss ||align=left| Filip Verlinden || Glory 15: Istanbul || Istanbul, Turkey || Decision (unanimous) || 3 || 3:00|| 12–2
|-
|-  bgcolor="#FFBBBB"
| 2014-02-16 || Loss ||align=left| Simon Marcus || Kunlun Fight 2 – 80kg tournament, Semi Finals || Zhengzhou, China || Ext. R Decision (split) || 4 || 3:00|| 12–1
|-
|-  bgcolor="#CCFFCC"
| 2013-11-27 || Win ||align=left| Qin Shan || Wu Lin Feng 2013 || Anyang, China || TKO || 3 || N/A || 12–0
|-
|-  bgcolor="#CCFFCC"
| 2013 || Win ||align=left| Nurla Mulali || Wu Lin Feng 2013 || Kashi, China || Decision (unanimous) || 3 || 3:00|| 11–0
|-
|-  bgcolor="#CCFFCC"
| 2012-07-21 || Win ||align=left| Niu Xiaoqiang || Wu Lin Feng 2012 || Auckland, New Zealand || KO (punches) || 3 || N/A || 10–0
|-
|-  bgcolor="#CCFFCC"
| 2012-06-23 || Win ||align=left| Xu Yi || Wu Lin Feng 2012 || Foshan, China || Decision (unanimous) || 3 || 3:00|| 9–0
|-
|-  bgcolor="#CCFFCC"
| 2011-09-24 || Win ||align=left| Guo Qiang || Wu Lin Feng 2011 || Kuala Lumpur, Malaysia || TKO (referee stoppage) || 3 || N/A|| 8–0
|-
|-  bgcolor="#CCFFCC"
| 2011-02-12 || Win ||align=left| Eds Eramiha || Rumble in the Ville || Auckland, New Zealand || Decision (unanimous) || 5 || 2:00 || 7–0
|-
|-  bgcolor="#CCFFCC"
| 2010-05-16 || Win ||align=left| Tim Atonio || Fight Force || Melbourne, Australia || Decision (unanimous) || 5 || 2:00 || 6–0 
|-
|-  bgcolor="#CCFFCC"
| 2010-12-04 || Win ||align=left| Eds Eramiha || Puma 8 Man Tournament || New Zealand || N/A || N/A || N/A || 5–0
|-
|-  bgcolor="#CCFFCC"
| 2010-12-04 || Win ||align=left| Ti'i Nanai || Puma 8 Man Tournament || New Zealand || N/A || N/A || N/A || 4–0
|-
|-  bgcolor="#CCFFCC"
| 2010-12-04 || Win ||align=left| Areta Gilbert || Puma 8 Man Tournament || New Zealand || N/A || N/A || N/A || 3–0
|-
|-  bgcolor="#CCFFCC"
| 2010-07-17 || Win ||align=left| Ben Davis || Lee Gar 35th Year Anniversary || New Zealand || N/A || N/A || N/A || 2–0
|-
|-  bgcolor="#CCFFCC"
| 2010-04-23 || Win ||align=left| Jerry Seagar || Bring the South to the City 3 || New Zealand || N/A || N/A || N/A || 1–0
|-
| colspan=9 | Legend'':

Professional boxing record

See also 
List of current UFC fighters
List of male kickboxers
List of male mixed martial artists

References

External links

 Israel Adesanya at GLORY

|-

|-

1989 births
Living people
Sportspeople from Lagos
New Zealand male kickboxers
Nigerian male kickboxers
Heavyweight kickboxers
Middleweight kickboxers
Glory kickboxers
Nigerian emigrants to New Zealand
Naturalised citizens of New Zealand
New Zealand people of Nigerian descent
New Zealand male boxers
Nigerian Muay Thai practitioners
New Zealand practitioners of Brazilian jiu-jitsu
Nigerian male boxers
Cruiserweight boxers
New Zealand male mixed martial artists
Nigerian male mixed martial artists
Nigerian practitioners of Brazilian jiu-jitsu
Sportspeople from Auckland
Kunlun Fight kickboxers
Ultimate Fighting Championship champions
Ultimate Fighting Championship male fighters
New Zealand cannabis activists
Mixed martial artists utilizing boxing
Mixed martial artists utilizing kickboxing
Mixed martial artists utilizing Brazilian jiu-jitsu